IQ or intelligence quotient is a score derived from one of several standardized tests designed to assess human intelligence.

IQ may also refer to:

Arts and entertainment

Film and television
 "IQ" (Frasier), episode 19 from the sixth season of the sitcom Frasier
 I.Q. (film), a 1994 comedy film starring Walter Matthau as Albert Einstein
 "iQ", an episode of the television series iCarly

Literature
 I.Q. (comics), a DC Comics character
 I, Q, a Star Trek novel
 I, Q (book series), a series of young adult fiction mysteries by Roland Smith
 I.Q., a Marvel Comics character from Young Allies

Other media
 IQ (band), a British neo-progressive rock band
 IQ (girl group), an American pop girl group
 I.Q.: Intelligent Qube, a puzzle game for the PlayStation
 Eye Cue, a Macedonian duo

Businesses and organisations
 IQ Crew, PC Services department of Circuit City electronics
 IQ.wiki, a wiki and encyclopedia on cryptocurrencies and blockchain companies
 Industries Qatar, a company based in Qatar
 Institute of Quarrying, an international engineering professional body based in Nottingham, England
 Augsburg Airways (IATA airline designator), a former German airline
 Qazaq Air (IATA airline designator), a Kazakh airline

Science and technology
 .iq, the Internet country code top-level domain (ccTLD) for Iraq
 2-Amino-3-methylimidazo[4,5-f]quinoline, a heterocyclic amine; See Heterocyclic amine formation in meat
 IQ 151, a microcomputer produced in Czechoslovakia during the 1980s
 I-Q signal, in-phase and quadrature components of amplitude modulated sinusoids
 IQ Modulation, an analog and a digital modulation scheme
 Image quality, characteristic of an image that measures perceived image degradation
 Information quality, quality of the content of information systems
 IQ for Quiescent current in electronics with no load

Other uses
 Iraq (ISO 3166 country code IQ)
 Ora iQ, a battery electric compact car
 Toyota iQ, an ultra-compact car
 Installation qualification, part of Verification and validation
 Inuit Qaujimajatuqangit, Inuit for traditional knowledge
 i.q., an initialism for the Latin phrase idem quod (the same as)
 Innovation Quarter, a district in Winston-Salem, North Carolina, United States

See also
 IQ Sapuri, a former Japanese game show
 Social IQ, a measure of a person's social ability compared to other people of their age